Smolenskaya is a station on the Filyovskaya line of the Moscow Metro. It was opened in 1935 as part of the first Metro line. Designed by S.G. Andriyevsky and T.N. Makarychev, the station features grey marble pillars with flared bases and walls faced with white ceramic tile. Smolenskaya originally had two entrance vestibules, but one was demolished with the expansion of the Garden Ring avenue. There are still two sets of exit stairs on the platform, but one leads to a dead end where the passage to the old vestibule (very similar to the one still in use at Chistye Prudy) used to be. There is no direct transfer to Smolenskaya. Instead, there is a direct transfer to Plyushchika planned to the station from the Arbatsko-Pokrovskaya line.

See also

 Smolenskaya (Arbatsko–Pokrovskaya line) for another Moscow Metro station with the same name.
 Smolensky Metro Bridge over the Moskva River connecting the station to Kievskaya.

External links

metro.ru
mymetro.ru
KartaMetro.info – Station location and exits on Moscow map (English/Russian)

Moscow Metro stations
Railway stations in Russia opened in 1935
Filyovskaya Line
Railway stations located underground in Russia